Thiruvettakudy is a revenue village in the Karaikal taluk of Karaikal District. It is situated to the north of Kottucheri town.

References 

 

Villages in Karaikal district